The 2013 Sun Belt Conference baseball tournament was held at M. L. Tigue Moore Field on the campus of the University of Louisiana at Lafayette in Lafayette, Louisiana, from May 22nd to May 26th, 2013.  The tournament returned to the double-elimination format used prior to the two year experiment with pool play in 2011 and 2012.  Florida Atlantic won their first tournament championship and earned the Sun Belt Conference's automatic bid to the 2013 NCAA Division I baseball tournament.  Florida Atlantic joined the conference in 2006, and left for Conference USA after the 2013 season.

Seeding
The top eight teams (based on conference results) from the conference earned invites to the tournament.  The teams were seeded based on conference winning percentage before playing a two bracket, double-elimination tournament.  The winner of each bracket then played a championship final.  Troy claimed the top seed over South Alabama and Louisiana–Lafayette earned the third seed over Western Kentucky by tiebreaker.

Results

All-Tournament Team
The following players were named to the All-Tournament Team.

Most Outstanding Player
Brendon Sanger was named Tournament Most Outstanding Player.  Sanger played for Florida Atlantic.

References

Sun Belt Conference Baseball Tournament
Sun Belt Conference baseball tournament
Tournament
Sun Belt Conference baseball tournament
College baseball tournaments in Louisiana
Sports in Lafayette, Louisiana